Bourréac is a commune in the Hautes-Pyrénées department in southwestern France near the city of Lourdes (4,5 km).

Its economy is based on residences (the village is included in the urban area of Lourdes), agriculture (animal husbandry mainly)  and tourism (gîtes ruraux).

Geography
The village overlooks Lezignan and Lourdes valley as from a balcony and stays in the center of a line of low hills, 500 to 600 m high, in front of the chain of Pyrenees Mountains, with notably the foreground Pic du Jer (950m), and, in the middle distance, the summits of Cabaliros (2334 m),  Hautacam (1500 to 1800 m), Montaigu (2339 m) and Pic du Midi de Bigorre (2877 m). Crest paths starts from the village, mainly the D807 in the direction of Recahorts (hamlet of Bourréac) and, then, Pouts (hamlet of a neighbour village, Escoubes-Pouts).

Population

Climate

The climate of Bourréac is that one mentioned by the meteo station of Ossun-Tarbes with a microclimate for special places resulting from their exposition to south and a protection from west wind. So in winter, local temperature is often 2 or 3 degrees higher than that noted in the valley of Lezignan and Lourdes.

History

Etymology
As many French words whose suffix is ac (from Latin acum ), Bourréac name comes from the name of an antique Gallo-Roman property, with the patronymic Burrius or Burrinus :  the property of Burrius.
On the neighbour place of Sendac, a marble Gallo-Roman statue has been discovered in 1846. It can be seen in the Jardin Massey Museum, in Tarbes.

Administration

Before 1789, during the old or Ancien Régime, Bourréac was included in the Barony of The Angles (name of a neighbouring village with a mediaeval castle).

See also
Communes of the Hautes-Pyrénées department

References
Bourreac official website

Communes of Hautes-Pyrénées